The Baby is the debut studio album by American singer-songwriter Samia. It was released on August 28, 2020, via Grand Jury Music.

Background 
On April 29, 2020, Samia released the single "Is There Something in the Movies" along with a music video that featured Maya Hawke and Charlie Plummer alongside Samia.

The album was announced on June 24, 2020, along with the single "Fit N Full". "Big Wheel" and "Stellate" were released as a double single on July 22, 2020. "Triptych", the final single, was released on August 25, 2020.

Post-release 
On October 19, 2020, Samia released a full band version of "Is There Something in the Movies?".

On November 18, 2020, Samia released a music video for "Waverly", which starred Nick Cianci, Ethan Cohen and Olivia Nikkanen.

On January 15, 2021, Samia released The Baby Reimagined, which consisted of covers and remixes of each of the songs from The Baby by fellow indie artists, including Palehound, Field Medic, Christian Lee Hutson, Briston Maroney and Bartees Strange among others.

Critical reception 
The Baby received positive reviews upon its release. Pitchfork gave The Baby a 7.9 out of 10. Paste Magazine placed the album at number 43 on their list of the 50 Best Albums of 2020.

Track listing

Personnel 
Samia Finnerty – vocals, lyrics
Caleb Hinz – production, engineering
Jake Luppen – production
Nathan Stocker – production, engineering
Lars Stolfers – production, engineering, mixing at Lankershim Studios in Los Angeles, CA
Joe LaPorta – mastering at Sterling Sound, New York, NY
Aria Herbst – photography
David Krammer – design

References

2020 debut albums
Samia (musician) albums